Chelsea is the primary village and a census-designated place (CDP) in the town of Chelsea, Orange County, Vermont, United States. It was first listed as a CDP prior to the 2020 census.

The CDP is in central Orange County, in the center of the town of Chelsea. It sits in the valley of the First Branch of the White River, part of the Connecticut River watershed. Vermont Route 110 runs through the village, leading north  to East Barre and south the same distance to South Royalton. Vermont Route 113 has its western terminus in Chelsea and leads southeast  to East Thetford, Vermont, on the Connecticut River.

References 

Populated places in Orange County, Vermont
Census-designated places in Orange County, Vermont
Census-designated places in Vermont